David Lam Tak-luk is a Hong Kong film director, producer and actor.

Filmography

References

External links
 
 HK Cinemagic entry

Hong Kong people of Hakka descent
People from Huiyang
Hong Kong film directors
Living people
Year of birth missing (living people)